Matthew Robinson (21 April 1907 – August 1987) was an English footballer. His regular position was as a forward. He was born in Felling, County Durham. He played for Cardiff City, Chester, and Manchester United.

External links
MUFCInfo.com profile

1907 births
1987 deaths
English footballers
Manchester United F.C. players
Cardiff City F.C. players
Chester City F.C. players
Date of death missing
People from County Durham (before 1974)
Footballers from Tyne and Wear
Association football forwards
Footballers from Gateshead